The World Accuses is a 1934 American drama film directed by Charles Lamont and starring Vivian Tobin, Dickie Moore and Cora Sue Collins.

Cast

References

Bibliography
 Michael R. Pitts. Poverty Row Studios, 1929–1940: An Illustrated History of 55 Independent Film Companies, with a Filmography for Each. McFarland & Company, 2005.

External links
 

1934 films
1934 drama films
American drama films
Films directed by Charles Lamont
Chesterfield Pictures films
American black-and-white films
1930s English-language films
1930s American films